Miguel Barbachano y Tarrazo (29 September 1807 – 17 December 1859) (Baqueiro 1896) was a liberal Yucatecan politician, who was 5 times governor of Yucatán between 1841 and 1853.

Miguel Barbachano y Tarrazo was born in the city of Campeche, a son of Manuel Barbachano and his wife, the former Maria Josefa Tarrazo.

He was one of the staunchest advocates for the independence of Yucatán from Mexico, but historical circumstances led to Yucatán twice declaring its independence while Barbachano was out of power, and twice Barbachano arranged for Yucatán's reunification with Mexico.

He generally alternated in power with the centrist Santiago Méndez, who was more in favor of union with Mexico but was driven to declare independence by the excesses of Mexican dictator Antonio López de Santa Anna.

The final reunification was due to the crisis of the Caste War of Yucatán.

Terms as governor
Miguel Barbachano's terms as Governor of Yucatán were:

 11 June 1841 to 13 October 1841
 18 August 1842 to 14 November 1843 
 15 May 1844 to 2 June 1844
 1 January 1846 to 21 January 1847 
 26 March 1848 to 13 February 1853

Marriages
He was married twice, first (in 1842) to Feliciana Camara and second (1851) to Maria del Pilar Quijano.

References 
 Baqueiro, Serapio. Estudio Biografico Del Excelentisimo Sr. D. Miguel Barbachano y Tarrazo Antiguo Gobernante de la Peninsula Yucateca. Mérida: Tipografia de G. Canto. 1896.

1807 births
1859 deaths
Governors of Yucatán (state)
Politicians from Campeche City
Yucatán independence activists